Copper is a former community in Jackson County, Oregon, United States. Copper was named for the copper mining in the region, including at the Blue Ledge mine just over the state line in California. The town had a post office from 1924 until 1932. The elevation of Copper is 1,949 feet.

The townsite was inundated in 1980 when Applegate Lake was formed by damming the Applegate River.

References

Former populated places in Jackson County, Oregon
Former populated places in Oregon
1924 establishments in Oregon